Oleg Vladimirovich Ovsyannikov (born 23 January 1970) is a Russian former competitive ice dancer. With partner Anjelika Krylova, he is the 1998 Olympic silver medalist and two-time (1998, 1999) World champion.

Career 
As a four-year-old, Ovsyannikov fell ill with pneumonia. After he recovered, doctors recommended to his parents that he enroll in some kind of sport, preferably in a fresh air environment. Initially a singles skater, he switched to ice dance at the age of 10.

With Maria Orlova, he won the bronze medal at the 1988 World Junior Championships. He later formed a partnership with Elena Kustarova and won bronze medals at the 1992 Grand Prix International de Paris and the 1993 Nations Cup, as well as two medals at the Russian Nationals.

In mid-1994 he teamed up with Anjelika Krylova. They were coached by Natalia Linichuk and Gennadi Karponosov in Newark, Delaware. Krylova injured her back in training shortly before they were set to leave for 1994 Skate America. Aggravated by intense training, the injury would plague her throughout their career.

In their first season together, Krylova and Ovsyannikov won the Russian national title and took bronze at the European Championship. They were fifth at the World Championships. 

During the 1995–96 season, Krylova and Ovsyannikov won silver at Skate America and gold at Nations Cup to qualify for the Champions Series Final (later renamed the Grand Prix Final) where they took silver. They also won silver at the Russian, European and World Championships. They were second at these events to Oksana Grishuk and Evgeni Platov.

During the 1996–97 season, Krylova and Ovsyannikov won three gold medals on the Champions Series at Skate America, Nations Cup and Cup of Russia. They qualified for the Champions Series Final in Canada where they were placed second to Canadians Shae-Lynn Bourne and Victor Kraatz. Krylova and Ovsyannikov won the silver medal at the European and World Championships, second at both events to Grishuk and Platov.

During the 1997–98 season, Krylova and Ovsyannikov won gold medals at Nations Cup and Cup of Russia but did not compete at the Champions Series Final. They won silver at the European Championships and followed it up with silver at the 1998 Olympics in Nagano, Japan. They were second at both events to Grishuk and Platov who retired after the Olympics. At the 1998 World Championships, they won their first World title ahead of Marina Anissina and Gwendal Peizerat.

During the 1998–99 season, Krylova and Ovsyannikov won gold at Sparkassen Cup (formerly Nations Cup) and Cup of Russia to qualify for the Grand Prix Final. They won the title ahead of Anissina and Peizerat. They won their first European title and then capped off their career with their second World title. 

Krylova and Ovsyannikov were planning to compete the following season and had prepared programs and costumes, however, doctors advised her to retire due to a risk of paralysis stemming from her back problem. She suggested that he team up with another skater but he declined. After a year, she felt more confident and they began performing in the less demanding world of professional skating. They won the 2001 World Professional title.

Personal life 
Ovsyannikov formerly coached in Newark, Delaware with his wife Angelika Kirchmayr, an ice dancer from Russia who won the 1989 World Junior Championships. Their daughter Michelle Ovsyannikov was born in 2006 in Austria. In 2007, Ovsyannikov was appointed the chief coach of the Russian national synchronized skating team and moved back to Moscow. He coaches at the KPRF Sport Club in Moscow.

Programs 
Eligible career with Krylova:

Show/professional career with Krylova:

Competitive highlights

With Krylova

With Kustarova

With Stekolnikova

With Orlova

References

External links 
 Official website: Krylova & Ovsyannikov
 

1970 births
Russian male ice dancers
Olympic figure skaters of Russia
Figure skaters at the 1998 Winter Olympics
Living people
Olympic silver medalists for Russia
Figure skaters from Moscow
Olympic medalists in figure skating
World Figure Skating Championships medalists
European Figure Skating Championships medalists
World Junior Figure Skating Championships medalists
Medalists at the 1998 Winter Olympics
Goodwill Games medalists in figure skating
Competitors at the 1998 Goodwill Games